London Helvecia Futsal Club is a futsal club based in London, England (United Kingdom). Founded in 2007, they compete in the FA National Futsal Series, the top division of English Futsal.

Helvecia are the most successful Futsal club in England, having won 8 league titles, 6 FA cups and have represented England in the UEFA Futsal cup / Champions League more times than any other English club.

Helvecia won their first major honour in 2008, complete a league and FA Futsal cup double. During the 2008/09 season Helvecia qualified for the then UEFA Futsal Cup (now Champions League) for their first time. Though Helvecia have yet to proceed past the preliminary rounds they have represented England 9 times in the competition.

Helvecia home kit colours are blue and white. The club's crest changed during the 2019/20 season so that it better represented the origins of the club. The club's local rivals are Loughborough and Manchester.

History 
{Update}

Crest and colours 
Crest

Helvecia have had two, which all underwent minor variations. The most recent change came in 2019, where the colours of the crest were amended to reflect the origins of the club along with the style and size of the central ball.

Colours

Helvecia has always worn blue and white kits. Often these colours would be solid or a mixture of both colours. Home kits featured a dominant blue, with away kits always in white.

Helvecia Women 
Helvecia also operate a women's Futsal team, London Helvecia Women's Futsal Club. They have been affiliated to the men's team since 2018.  They play their home games at Leyton Leisure Centre.

Helvecia Academy 
Helvecia started its academy during the 2019/20 season. Initially created of upper phase age ranges the appointment at the end of the 2018/19 season was the start of the building of the academy. The academy has two centres; the primary camp in London and the other in the midlands. This allows Helvecia to attract the best young players from the widest spectrum throughout the UK. The academy caters for U6 to U16 players, and includes the community initiatives of the club.

Honours

Domestic

League Titles

FA Futsal League: 9
 2008, 2009, 2010, 2011, 2012, 2017, 2019,2021, 2022

Cups

FA Futsal Cups: 6
 2008, 2009, 2010, 2011, 2018, 2019

Doubles

FA Futsal League and FA Futsal Cup: 6
 2008: League and FA Futsal Cup
2009: League and FA Futsal Cup
2010: League and FA Futsal Cup
2011: League and FA Futsal Cup
2019: League and FA Futsal Cup

UEFA Futsal Cup / Champions League 
Appearances: 9

Current squad

Notable Players - Past and Present 
Maximilian William Kilman
José Carlos Lopez Lozano
Carlos Muñoz Delgado
Eduardo A Gomes
Ari Santos
Raoni Medina
Lucas Totti

See also

 FA Futsal League
 Futsal in England

References

External links
 Official website

Futsal clubs in England
Sports teams in London
Futsal clubs established in 2007
2007 establishments in England